John Rodgers (11 July 1914 – 7 March 2004) was an American geologist who was Silliman Professor of Geology at Yale University.

Biography
He was born in Albany, New York to Henry and Louise (Allen) Rodgers and was educated at Albany Academy. He then studied at Cornell University, where he was awarded a B.A. in 1936 and an M.S. in geology in 1937. He gained a post-graduate Ph.D. at Yale University in 1944. In the latter year, during the Second World War, he joined the Military Geology Branch of the United States Geological Survey and was delegated to map beachheads from Kamchatka in Siberia down to China and Japan.

In 1946 he accepted a post in the Department of Geology at Yale, becoming in 1962 the Benjamin Silliman Professor, a position he was to hold for the rest of his career. At Yale he began to research the geology of Connecticut, producing a full geological map of the state in 1985.

In 1948 he was appointed an assistant editor of the American Journal of Science, becoming its editor from 1954 to 1995. In 1970 he served as president of the Geological Society of America. He was a Guggenheim Fellow in 1973–74.

In his private life he was a proficient pianist and linguist. He died in 2004 at his home in Hamden, Connecticut and is buried at Evergreen Cemetery, New Haven in a plot reserved for people who have donated their bodies to science.

Honors and awards
 Member, National Academy of Sciences
 Member, American Academy of Arts and Sciences
 Member, American Philosophical Society
 Fellow, American Association for the Advancement of Science
 Fellow, Geological Society of America
 1947 Medal of Freedom from the U. S. Army
 1981 Penrose Medal of the Geological Society of America
 1987 Prix Gaudry of the Geological Society of France
 1987 Fourmarier Medal of the Royal Academy of Science, Letters and Fine Arts of Belgium

Works
 Principles of Stratigraphy with Carl Dunbar (1957)
 The Company I Kept, autobiography  (2001)

References

1914 births
2004 deaths
People from Albany, New York
Cornell University alumni
Yale Graduate School of Arts and Sciences alumni
20th-century American geologists
Presidents of the Geological Society of America
Members of the United States National Academy of Sciences
Foreign Members of the USSR Academy of Sciences
Foreign Members of the Russian Academy of Sciences
Fellows of the American Association for the Advancement of Science
Members of the American Philosophical Society